Allison House may refer to:

Allison House, a house on Colonial Street at the Universal Studios Lot in Universal City, California
George Allison House, Live Oak, Florida, listed on the National Register of Historic Places (NRHP)
Allison Mansion, Indianapolis, Indiana, listed on the NRHP in Marion County
Allison-Robinson House, Spencer, Indiana, listed on the NRHP in Owen County
Allison-Barrickman House, Harrods Creek neighborhood of Louisville, Kentucky, listed on the NRHP in Jefferson County
Allison-Reinkeh House, Hamilton, Montana, listed on the NRHP in Ravalli County
Capt. Samuel Allison House, Dublin, New Hampshire, listed on the NRHP in Cheshire County
Allison Dormitory, Santa Fe, New Mexico, listed on the NRHP in Santa Fe County
Allison Woods, Statesville, North Carolina, listed on the NRHP in Iredell County
Allison Ranger Station, Burns, Oregon, listed on the NRHP
Potter-Allison Farm, Centre Hall, Pennsylvania, listed on the NRHP in Centre County
William Allison House (Spring Mills, Pennsylvania), listed on the NRHP in Centre County
Robert Barnwell Allison House, Lancaster, South Carolina, listed on the NRHP in Lancaster County
Allison Plantation, York, South Carolina, listed on the NRHP in York County
William Allison House (College Grove, Tennessee), listed on the NRHP in Williamson County
Ratcliffe-Logan-Allison House, Fairfax, Virginia, listed on the NRHP

See also
William Allison House (disambiguation)